Julie Ann Corman ( Halloran; born ) is an American film producer. She is married to film producer and director Roger Corman.

Career
In 1970, Julie Corman married film director/producer, Roger Corman. Corman produced a series of "Night Nurses" films, including Night Call Nurses and Candy Stripe Nurses. She went on to produce Moving Violation, starring Kay Lenz and Eddie Albert; Crazy Mama, directed by Jonathan Demme, starring Cloris Leachman, The Lady in Red, written by John Sayles, starring Robert Conrad and Pamela Sue Martin; Saturday the 14th, starring Richard Benjamin, Paula Prentiss and Jeffrey Tambor; and Da, starring Barnard Hughes, based on the Tony Award-winning play.

In 1984, Corman started her own company, Trinity Pictures, with which she has produced a number of family films, two of which are based on Newbery Award-winning novels: A Cry in the Wild is based on Gary Paulsen’s novel, Hatchet, and Get a Clue is based on Ellen Raskin’s novel, The Westing Game.

Corman has produced several other family films: The Dirt Bike Kid, starring Peter Billingsley; Max is Missing, shot at Machu Picchu in Peru; and Legend of the Lost Tomb, based on Walter Dean Myers’s book Tales of a Dead King and shot in Egypt.  She made a series of wilderness films: White Wolves: A Cry in the Wild II, starring Mark-Paul Gosselaar and White Wolves II: Legend of the Wild, starring Elizabeth Berkley, Corin Nemec, Justin Whalin and Jeremy London. The Academy of Family Film and Television named her “Producer of the Year” for her achievements in 1996.

From 2000 to 2002, Corman served as Chair of the Graduate Film Department at New York University in the Maurice Kanbar Institute of Film and Television.  While there, Corman executive produced a series of short films by NYU film students, Reflections from Ground Zero, based on the students’ 9/11 experiences. The films aired on Showtime.

Corman is a member of Women in Film and the International Women's Forum. She has given various film seminars at NYU, Duke University and Sundance. She has received a career achievement award from Fantastic Fest in Austin, Texas and was given the Indy Pioneer Award at the Kansas City Filmmakers Jubilee.

Filmography

Producer

Boxcar Bertha 1971
Night Call Nurses 1972
The Student Teachers 1973
The Young Nurses 1973
Summer School Teachers 1974
Candy Stripe Nurses 1974
Crazy Mama 1975
Moving Violation 1976
The Lady in Red 1979
Saturday the 14th 1981
The Dirt Bike Kid 1985
Chopping Mall 1986
Nowhere to Hide 1987
Saturday the 14th Strikes Back 1988
Nightfall 1988
Da 1988 
Drop-Out Mother (TV movie) 1988
The Nest 1988
Nowhere to Run 1989
A Cry in the Wild 1990
Brain Dead 1990
Sorority House Massacre II 1990
White Wolves: A Cry in the Wild II 1993
The Silence of the Hams 1994
Max Is Missing (TV movie) 1995
White Wolves II: Legend of the Wild 1995
Get a Clue (The Westing Game) (TV movie) 1997
Legend of the Lost Tomb (TV movie) 1997
Cyclops (TV movie) 2008 (Co-Producer)
Splatter (TV series short) 2009 (Co-Producer)
Sharktopus (TV movie) 2010 (Co-Producer)
Dinoshark (TV movie) 2010 (Co-Producer)

References

External links

New Horizons company website

Living people
Place of birth missing (living people)
American film producers
American women film producers
1942 births
21st-century American women